Evolucion de Amor (Evolution of Love) is a studio album released by the romantic ensemble Los Temerarios. All songs were composed by Adolfo Angel Alva, otherwise is indicated. The tracks were arranged like in the songs of Si Tú Te Vas album.

Track list

Charts

Weekly charts

Year-end charts

Certification

References

Los Temerarios albums
2009 albums
Fonovisa Records albums